Anita Lizana de Ellis (19 November 1915 – 21 August 1994) was a world No. 1 tennis player from Chile. She was the first Latin American, and first Hispanic person, to be ranked World Number 1 tennis player. Also, Lizana was the first Latin American to win a Grand Slam singles championship. She won the U.S. Championships singles title in 1937, defeating Jadwiga Jędrzejowska in the final in straight sets.

Career
In the singles event of the 1937 U.S. Championships Lizana defeated three seeded players without losing a set to reach the final where she beat Jadwiga Jędrzejowska, also in straight sets. At the Wimbledon Championships she reached the singles quarterfinals in 1936 and 1937. In 1936 she lost to second-seeded and eventual champion Helen Jacobs while in 1937 sixth-seeded Simonne Mathieu proved too strong.

She won the Scottish Championships four times (1935–37, 46).

In 1936 Lizana won the singles titles at the British Covered Court Championships, played on wood courts at the Queen's Club in London, and the South of England Championships in Eastbourne where she defeated Dorothy Round in the final in straight sets. That year she was a runner-up to Kay Stammers at the British Hard Court Championships but in 1937 she won the title after a victory in the final against Peggy Scriven. The same year she won the Riviera Championships at Menton, France, the Pacific Coast Championships in Berkeley, California, and the British Hard Court Championships in Bournemouth.

According to A. Wallis Myers of The Daily Telegraph and the Daily Mail, she was ranked in the world top ten in 1936 and 1937 reaching a career high of world No. 1 in 1937. 

After her marriage she limited her playing to some British tournaments. World War II and the birth of her children effectively ended her career as a top player. She did play some tournaments in 1946 and won the Scottish Championships in Edinburgh in July and the Scottish Hard Court Championships held at St. Andrews in August. At Wimbledon she reached second round in the singles event.

Personal life
In Santiago she lived in a house within the boundaries of the Quinta Normal Park.  In July 1938, at the Brompton Oratory in London, she married Scottish coal merchant and tennis player Ronald Taylor Ellis (d. 1978) and the couple settled in Dundee. They had three daughters. Lizana died of stomach cancer on 21 August 1994.

In 2015 the main court of the national tennis stadium in Santiago was named "Court Central Anita Lizana" in her honor.

Grand Slam finals

Singles: 1 (1 title)

Grand Slam singles tournament timeline

R = restricted to French nationals and held under German occupation.

1In 1946 and 1947, the French Championships were held after Wimbledon.

See also
 Performance timelines for all female tennis players who reached at least one Grand Slam final
 World number one women tennis players

Notes

References

External links
  (Spanish site: her basic biography)

1915 births
1994 deaths
Chilean female tennis players
Tennis players from Santiago
United States National champions (tennis)
Grand Slam (tennis) champions in women's singles
People associated with Dundee
World number 1 ranked female tennis players
Deaths from cancer in England
Deaths from stomach cancer
20th-century Chilean women